ACCU may refer to:
 Autodefensas Campesinas de Cordoba y Uraba, a Colombian paramilitary group
 Accu (battery), a battery that can be restored to full charge by the application of electrical energy
 ACCU (organisation), a software development user group
 Accu (organisation), a UK-based precision component supplier
 Association of Catholic Colleges and Universities
 People's Choice Credit Union, formerly the Australian Central Credit Union
 Asia/Pacific Cultural Centre for UNESCO
 Aquarian Christine Church Universal, a religious movement founded by Levi Dowling